Cheng Tsz Sum (born 20 March 1999) is a Hong Kong professional footballer who currently plays as a midfielder for Hong Kong Premier League club Tai Po.

Club career
On 5 August 2017, Cheng was unveiled as part of Lee Man's inaugural squad.

On 31 July 2018, Cheng was named as one of Tai Po's summer signings.

On 1 July 2020, Eastern announced that Cheng would join the club.

On 6 September 2021, Cheng rejoined Rangers.

On 8 August 2022, Cheng returned to Tai Po.

Honours

Club
Tai Po
Hong Kong Premier League: 2018–19

International
Hong Kong
 Guangdong-Hong Kong Cup: 2019

References

External links
 
 Cheng Tsz Sum at HKFA
 

1999 births
Living people
Hong Kong footballers
Association football midfielders
Hong Kong Rangers FC players
Lee Man FC players
Tai Po FC players
Eastern Sports Club footballers
Hong Kong Premier League players